The 2010 United States House of Representatives elections in South Carolina were held on Tuesday, November 2, 2010. The primary elections were held on June 8.
The composition of the state delegation before the election was four Republicans and two Democrats.

After the general election, the composition of the state delegation entering the 112th Congress was five Republicans and just one Democrat.

All seats were rated safe for their incumbent parties except for district 5.

Overview

By district
Results of the 2010 United States House of Representatives elections in South Carolina by district:

District 1

Incumbent Republican Congressman Henry E. Brown Jr. has been in office since 2001 and is retiring. The open seat was contested by Democrat Ben Frasier, Republican Tim Scott, Green Robert Dobbs, Libertarian Keith Blandford, Working Families Rob Groce, United Citizens Milton Elmer "Mac" McCullough Jr. and Independence Party Jimmy Wood. Scott defeated Paul Thurmond in the primary runoff election.

! style="background:#111; width:2px;"|
  | Working Families
  | Rob Groce
  | align="right" |4,148
  | align="right" |1.77
|-

 ! style="background-color:#DDDDDD; width: 2px" | 
  | Independence
  | Jimmy Wood
  | align="right" |2,489
  | align="right" |1.07
|-
! style="background:#f09; width:2px;"|
  | United Citizens 
  | Milton Elmer McCullough Jr.|Milton Elmer "Mac" McCullough Jr.
  | align="right" |1,013
  | align="right" |0.43
|-

South Carolina District 1 race from OurCampaigns.com
Campaign contributions from OpenSecrets
2010 South Carolina - 1st District from CQ Politics
Race profile at The New York Times

District 2

Incumbent Republican Congressman Joe Wilson has been in office since 2001. Wilson defeated Democratic nominee Iraq War Veteran Rob Miller, Libertarian Eddie McCain, and the Constitution Party's Marc Beaman.

South Carolina District 2 race from OurCampaigns.com
Campaign contributions from OpenSecrets
2010 South Carolina - 2nd District from CQ Politics
Race profile at The New York Times

District 3

Incumbent Republican Congressman J. Gresham Barrett had been in office since 2003, but decided to retire to run for Governor. The open seat was contested by Republican nominee Jeff Duncan, Democratic / Working Families nominee Jane Ballard Dyer, and Constitution Party nominee John Dalen.  Duncan had come in second in the Republican Primary at 25%, but beat Richard Cash in the runoff 51% to 49%.

South Carolina District 3 race from OurCampaigns.com
Campaign contributions from OpenSecrets
2010 South Carolina - 3rd District from CQ Politics
Race profile at The New York Times

District 4

This was an open seat. Incumbent Republican Congressman Bob Inglis had been in office since 2005, but he lost to Trey Gowdy in the primary election. Trey Gowdy would go on to defeat the Democratic nominee Paul Corden, Green Party's Faye Walters, Libertarian Rick Mahler, and the Constitution Party's Dave Edwards.

South Carolina District 4 race from OurCampaigns.com
Campaign contributions from OpenSecrets
2010 South Carolina - 4th District from CQ Politics
Candidates For Congress Debate Live At WYFF4 at WYFF, October 12, 2010

District 5

Democratic incumbent John Spratt was defeated by Republican Mick Mulvaney.

South Carolina District 5 race from OurCampaigns.com
Campaign contributions from OpenSecrets
2010 South Carolina - 5th District from CQ Politics
Race profile at The New York Times

District 6

Incumbent Democratic Congressman Jim Clyburn has been in office since 1993. Clyburn won re-election against Republican Jim Pratt and Nammu Y. Muhammad of the Green Party.

South Carolina District 6 race from OurCampaigns.com
Campaign contributions from OpenSecrets
2010 South Carolina - 6th District from CQ Politics
South Carolina 2010 Official Election Results from South Carolina State Election Commission
Race profile at The New York Times

See also
Politics of South Carolina

References

External links
South Carolina State Election Commission
Official Candidate List
U.S. Congress candidates for South Carolina at Project Vote Smart
South Carolina U.S. House from OurCampaigns.com
Campaign contributions for U.S. Congressional races in South Carolina from OpenSecrets
2010 South Carolina General Election graph of multiple polls from Pollster.com

House - South Carolina from the Cook Political Report
Race Ratings Chart: House from CQ Politics

South Carolina
2010
2010 South Carolina elections